Hartwood railway station is a railway station serving Hartwood in North Lanarkshire, Scotland. The station has two platforms, connected by a stairway footbridge. It is managed by ScotRail.

The station was built within the grounds of Hartwood Hospital, a major psychiatric hospital, which used to provide the bulk of the passenger traffic. A short mineral branch once ran from the far side of the northern platform to the main hospital buildings to transport coal and other commodities.

This hospital was closed in 1998, with its services transferred to the nearby Hartwoodhill Hospital, but this is too far away to make use of the railway station. The station was partially rebuilt in 2018 and the line electrified with full electric services starting from the May 19th change of timetable in 2019.

Services 

It is currently served, Monday to Saturday, by one ScotRail stopping service each hour from Glasgow Central to Edinburgh Waverley and return. On Sundays, there is now a limited (six trains per day each) way service to both Glasgow and Edinburgh throughout the year, which is supplemented on Sundays on the run up to Christmas by additional hourly trains to/from Glasgow via .

References

Sources

External links

 RAILSCOT on Cleland and Midcalder Line
 Hartwood Hospital - a brief history Scotland Genealogy
 Video footage and history of Hartwood Station

Railway stations in North Lanarkshire
Railway stations served by ScotRail
SPT railway stations
Former Caledonian Railway stations
Railway stations in Great Britain opened in 1889